Cantz is a surname. Notable people with the surname include:

Bart Cantz (1860–1943), American baseball player
Guido Cantz (born 1971), German television presenter

See also
Lantz (surname)